Ernest Henry Preeg (1934-2017) is an American economist from Virginia. He holds a B.S. in Marine Transportation from State University of New York Maritime College, an M.A. and Ph.D. in Economics from The New School of Social Research in New York City.  He has served as U.S. Ambassador to Haiti from 1981 to 1983. He was a Senior Fellow with the Manufacturers Alliance (MAPI). Later, he  gave testimony to Congress and the U.S. China Security Review Commission on manipulation of U.S. currency by China and Japan. In 2008, he presented at the Alfred P. Sloan Industry Studies Conference: Innovation in Global Industries.

Biography
He has served in numerous academic and government positions including Senior Economic Advisory for the Philippines, Executive Director of the Economic Policy Group for the White House Staff, Deputy Assistant Secretary of State for International Finance and Development, Director for the Office of European Communities and OECD Affairs.  He has published numerous books and articles on international trade and economics. In 2008 he published India and China: An Advanced Technology Race and How the United States Should Respond.

References

External links

2001 U.S. government hearings, Ernest H. Preeg Biography
Ernest H. Preeg, Statement before the U.S. China Economic Security Review Commission, April 21, 2005
Manufacturers Alliance (MAPI)
New School of Social Research

Economists from New York (state)
Ambassadors of the United States to Haiti
Living people
1934 births
The New School alumni
State University of New York Maritime College alumni
20th-century American diplomats